East Fork Township is one of fifteen townships in Clinton County, Illinois, USA.  As of the 2010 census, its population was 400 and it contained 236 housing units.  Its name changed to Morris on June 1, 1874 and then back to East Fork.

Geography

Unincorporated towns
 Boulder
(This list is based on USGS data and may include former settlements.)

Cemeteries
The township contains these eight cemeteries: Brewster, Clark, Ebenezer, Hawkins, New Carter, Old Carter, Prairie Chapel and Prichett.

Rivers
 North Fork Kaskaskia River

Demographics

School districts
 Carlyle Community Unit School District 1
 Patoka Community Unit School District 100
 Sandoval Community Unit School District 501

Political districts
 Illinois' 19th congressional district
 State House District 107
 State Senate District 54

References
 
 United States Census Bureau 2007 TIGER/Line Shapefiles
 United States National Atlas

External links
 City-Data.com
 Illinois State Archives

Townships in Clinton County, Illinois
Townships in Illinois